Isami Enomoto (May 17, 1929 – February 16, 2016) was a ceramicist from Hawaii. He is best known for his labor murals, which are on display at the University of Hawaiʻi – West Oʻahu library.

Career
Enomoto was born on May 17, 1929, in Hilo, Hawaii. He studied art at the University of Hawaii at Manoa, where he met Claude Horan and began working with clay. After graduate school, Enomoto joined the United States Army and fought in the Korean War. He met and married his wife Zora Kagawa while going through basic training. Enomoto joined Horan's company, Ceramics Hawaii, after he was discharged from the military. He then bought the company when Horan decided to return to teaching in 1957. He operated Ceramics Hawaii until his death on February 16, 2016. The business closed shortly thereafter, on April 30.

Enomoto worked with Vladimir Ossipoff on the wall tiles in the International Concourse of the Honolulu Airport, and with Jean Charlot on the murals on the United Public Works building in Honolulu.

Labor murals

In 1960, the Bank of Hawaii built a new branch in Kapahulu, a district in Honolulu. They commissioned a mural for the wall above the teller counter. Enomoto was selected because the Ceramics Hawaii Studio was in the same neighborhood as the bank, making a local connection. He made five 6-foot tall murals that were 45 feet long when lined up depicting scenes of commerce, agriculture, transportation, and labor in Hawaii. The ceramic murals were mounted on plywood reinforced by steel channels. The largest section weighed 650 pounds. They were in a style similar to the public works projects created during the Great Depression.

In 2015, the Bank of Hawaii decided to close the Kapahulu branch. The bank did not want to keep the murals, and local art museums could not accept such large, heavy pieces. Docomo Hawaii managed and stored the pieces until a new home was found for them. They donated the murals to the University of Hawaii, West Oahu's Center for Labor Education and Research (CLEAR) in 2017, after $50,000 was raised to install the piece. The Hawaii Historic Foundation awarded CLEAR's director, William Puette, a Preservation Honor Award for their efforts to preserve and re-home the pieces.

References

1929 births
2016 deaths
Ceramists from Hawaii
People from Hilo, Hawaii
University of Hawaiʻi at Mānoa alumni
American military personnel of Japanese descent
American artists of Japanese descent
Hawaii people of Japanese descent